A general election was held in the U.S. state of Mississippi on November 5, 2019. All executive offices in the state were up for election. The primary election was held on August 6, 2019 and runoff elections were held on August 27, 2019. Although the Democrats came close to winning the governorship, they ultimately failed to do so. In addition, they lost the sole statewide office they have held since 1878: the Attorney General.

Governor

Lieutenant Governor

Incumbent Republican Lieutenant Governor Tate Reeves, who was reelected in 2015 with 60%, was ineligible to run for a third term due to term limits and successfully ran for governor instead.

Democratic primary

Candidates
J. P. Hughes Jr., listed as "Jay Hughes" on the ballot, Member of the Mississippi House of Representatives from the 12th district

Results

Republican primary

Candidates
Delbert Hosemann, Secretary of State of Mississippi 
Shane Quick

Results

General election

Results

Secretary of State

Incumbent Republican Secretary of State Delbert Hosemann declined to run for a fourth term and instead successfully ran for Lieutenant Governor.

Democratic primary

Candidates
Johnny DuPree, former mayor of Hattiesburg and nominee for Governor of Mississippi in 2011
Maryra Hunt

Results

Republican primary

Candidates
Sam Britton, commissioner for the Southern District of the Mississippi Public Service Commission
Michael Watson, member of the Mississippi State Senate from the 51st District

Results

General election

Results

Attorney General

Incumbent Democratic Attorney General Jim Hood declined to run for a fifth term and instead ran for governor. Republican state treasurer Lynn Fitch defeated Democrat Jennifer Collins to become the first Republican Attorney General since the Reconstruction era.

Democratic primary

Candidates
Jennifer Riley Collins, former director of the American Civil Liberties Union of Mississippi

Results

Republican primary

Candidates
Mark Baker, member of the Mississippi House of Representatives from the 74th District
Lynn Fitch, Treasurer of Mississippi
Andy Taggart, Madison County supervisor

Results

Runoff

General election

Results

State Auditor

Republican primary

Candidates
Shad White, incumbent

Results

General election

Results

State Treasurer

Incumbent Republican Treasurer Lynn Fitch declined to run for a third term and instead chose to run for Attorney General.

Democratic primary

Candidates
Addie Lee Green

Results

Republican primary

Candidates
Eugene Clarke, member of the Mississippi State Senate from the 22nd District
David McRae, businessman and candidate for  State Treasurer in 2015

Results

General election

Results

Commissioner of Agriculture and Commerce

Democratic primary

Candidates
Rickey Cole, former Mississippi Democratic Party Chairman

Results

Republican primary

Candidates
Andy Gipson, incumbent

Results

General election

Results

Commissioner of Insurance

Democratic primary

Candidates
Robert Amos

Results

Republican primary

Candidates
Mike Chaney, incumbent

Results

General election

Results

Public Service Commission

Northern District

Democratic primary

Candidates
Brandon Presley, incumbent

Results

General election

Results

Central District

Democratic primary

Candidates
Dorothy Benford
Ryan Brown
Bruce Burton
De'Keither Stamps

Results

Runoff

Republican primary

Candidates
Brent Bailey
Nic Lott

Results

General election

Results

Southern District

Democratic primary

Candidates
Connie Moran, former mayor of Ocean Springs
Sugar Stallings

Results

Republican primary

Candidates
Dane Maxwell, mayor of Pascagoula
Kelvin Schulz

Results

General election

Results

Transportation Commission

Northern District

Democratic primary

Candidates
Joey Grist, former state representative

Results

Republican primary

Candidates
Trey Bowman
John Caldwell
E. Allen Hathcock
Jeremy Martin
Geoffrey Yoste

Results

Runoff

General election

Results

Central District

Democratic primary

Candidates
Willie Simmons, state senator
Marcus Wallace

Results

Republican primary

Candidates
Butch Lee
Ricky Pennington, Jr.

Results

General election

Results

Southern District

Republican primary

Candidates
Tom King, incumbent
Tony Smith, state senator
Chad Toney

Results

General election

Results

References

External links
Official campaign websites for Lt. Governor
 Delbert Hosemann (R) for Lt. Governor
 Jay Hughes (D) for Lt. Governor 

Official campaign websites for Secretary of State
 Johnny DuPree (D) for Secretary of State 
 Michael Watson (R) for Secretary of State

Official campaign websites for Attorney General
 Jennifer Riley Collins (D) for Attorney General 
 Lynn Fitch (R) for Attorney General

Official campaign websites for Auditor
 Shad White (R) for Auditor

Official campaign websites for Treasurer
 Addie Lee Green (D) for Treasurer
 David McRae (R) for Treasurer

Official campaign websites for Agriculture and Commerce Commissioner
 Rickey Cole (D) for Ag Commissioner
 Andy Gipson (R) for Ag Commissioner

Official campaign websites for Insurance Commissioner
 Robert Amos (D) for Insurance Commissioner 
 Mike Chaney (R) for Insurance Commissioner

 
Mississippi